Comrie may refer to:

Places
Comrie (crater), a lunar crater
Comrie, Fife, a village in Fife, Scotland
Comrie, Perth and Kinross, a village and parish in Strathearn, Scotland

People with the surname
Aaron Comrie (born 1997), Scottish footballer
Adam Comrie (1990–2020), Canadian ice hockey player
Bernard Comrie (born 1947), British linguist
Elvis Comrie (born 1959), American soccer player
Eric Comrie, born 1995), Canadian ice hockey player
John Comrie (1875–1939), Scottish physician and medical historian
Leroy Comrie, New York City council member
Leslie Comrie (1893–1950), New Zealand astronomer
Mike Comrie (born 1980), Canadian ice hockey player
Neil Comrie (born 1947), Australian police commissioner
Paul Comrie (born 1977), Canadian ice hockey player